Kiss of Death is a 1947 American film noir directed by Henry Hathaway and written by Ben Hecht and Charles Lederer from a story by Eleazar Lipsky. The story revolves around an ex-con played by Victor Mature and his former partner-in-crime, Tommy Udo (Richard Widmark in his first film).  The movie also starred Brian Donlevy and introduced Coleen Gray in her first billed role. The film has received critical praise since its release, with two Academy Award nominations.

Plot
On Christmas Eve, down-on-his-luck ex-convict Nick Bianco and his three cohorts rob a jewelry store. Before they can exit the building, however, the injured proprietor sets off his alarm. While attempting to escape, Nick assaults a police officer but is wounded and arrested.

The Assistant District Attorney Louis D'Angelo tries to persuade Nick to name his accomplices in exchange for a light sentence. Confident that his partners in crime and his lawyer, Earl Howser, will look after his wife and two young daughters while he is incarcerated, Nick refuses and is given a 20-year sentence. Three years later, at Sing Sing Prison, after his wife does not write for 3 months, Nick discovers that she has committed suicide.

Nick is visited in prison by Nettie Cavallo, a young woman who used to babysit his girls. She tells him that his daughters have been sent to an orphanage. Nick decides to tell all to D'Angelo but, because so much time has elapsed, D'Angelo cannot use Nick's information about the jewelry store robbery to reduce his sentence. In exchange for being able to see his children, he spills about the job. D'Angelo then decides to keep Nick in the city jail and use him as an informant. He keeps Nick clean in the eyes of other shady characters and Howser (who acts on behalf of his criminal clients as a go-between for a fence) by making it seem Nick is being charged with a previous, unsolved robbery he pulled off with his accomplice Pete Rizzo. D'Angelo then instructs Nick to imply to the lawyer that Rizzo squealed about this job.

Howser arranges for Tommy Udo, a psychopathic killer who did time with Bianco, to take care of Rizzo.  When Udo shows up at Rizzo's tenement, only the criminal's wheelchair-using mother is present; she tells Udo that her son is out but will return that evening. Udo examines the apartment and determines that Rizzo has probably left town. Udo binds Mrs. Rizzo to her wheelchair with an electrical cord and pushes her down a flight of stairs, killing her.

Soon after, Nick is freed on parole at D'Angelo's behest, and visits Nettie, pledging his love to her. But in order to remain out, Nick must continue his work with D'Angelo. He arranges a "chance" meeting with Udo and pretends to be friendly as an old prison pal from Sing Sing. Udo takes Nick to a couple of clubs, including one at which narcotics are being smoked. Nick reports back to D'Angelo, who is satisfied that he has enough to indict Udo and get a conviction. D'Angelo then releases Nick from further work.

Nick starts a new life in Astoria, Queens, with his wife, Nettie, and the children. When Udo's trial begins, D'Angelo summons Nick to let him know that his testimony is required. Despite him taking the stand, though, Udo is acquitted.

Certain that Udo will seek revenge, Nick sends Nettie and the girls to the country. He then goes to deal with Udo and finds him at Luigi's restaurant in East Harlem. Inside, Udo threatens Nettie and the girls, whereupon Nick reminds him that during their night out, Udo gave Nick incriminating information about himself.

Udo leaves to wait in his sedan out front, which Nick notices. He telephones and summons D'Angelo to come with police to the restaurant in exactly two minutes, then goes outside. Udo shoots Nick and is quickly surrounded by police, shot, and arrested. Though badly wounded, Nick also survives; he and Nettie look forward to a happy, peaceful life together.

Cast
 Victor Mature as Nick Bianco 
 Brian Donlevy as Assistant D.A. Louis D'Angelo
 Coleen Gray as Nettie Cavallo
 Richard Widmark as Tommy Udo
 Taylor Holmes as Earl Howser
 Howard Smith as Warden
 Karl Malden as Sgt. William Cullen
 Mildred Dunnock as Mrs. Rizzo (uncredited)
 Eva Condon as the nun in orphanage (uncredited)
 Patricia Morison as Nick's wife (scenes deleted)

Production

Development
Kiss of Death is based on a story by former district attorney Lawrence Blaine. It was purchased by 20th Century Fox in November 1946 specifically as a vehicle for Victor Mature.

Casting
Victor Mature plays Nick Bianco, the lead role in the film. Coleen Gray plays Nettie, his second wife, who also narrates the beginning and ending of the film. Brian Donlevy plays Louis D'Angelo, the assistant district attorney.

Kiss of Death is notable for being Richard Widmark's film debut as Tommy Udo (a role originally announced for Richard Conte). According to Widmark, Hathaway disliked his high hairline because he thought it made him look too intellectual, so he ordered Widmark fitted for a hairpiece. Hathaway didn't send the test ahead to Zanuck because he wanted a nightclub piano player called "Harry the Hipster" to play Udo. A Fox production manager named Charlie Hill liked the test and sent it to Zanuck, who immediately signed Widmark. During the film, Udo uses a Benzedrine inhaler, which was suggested by Zanuck himself.

Critics and audiences have noted that Tommy Udo is similar to Batman's archenemy The Joker. Widmark himself was a big fan of Batman comics, and modeled Udo after The Joker. Frank Gorshin, who played The Riddler in the 1960s television series Batman, modeled his deranged cackle after Widmark's Udo.

Attorney Earl Howser was played by Taylor Holmes, while Howard Smith was cast as a prison warden. Character actor Karl Malden got the part of Sergeant William Cullen while in the Broadway run of Arthur Miller's breakthrough play All My Sons. After doing this film, Malden took a three-year break from film acting, during which he created the role of Mitch in Tennessee Williams's A Streetcar Named Desire on Broadway opposite Marlon Brando, Jessica Tandy, and Kim Hunter.  He returned to films in 1950 in a small part as a bartender in The Gunfighter, starring Gregory Peck in the leading role.

Susan Cabot and Jesse White made their screen debuts in this film; they were both uncredited. Cabot plays a restaurant patron and White plays a taxi driver. Character actor Millard Mitchell also is uncredited as Detective Shelby. Mildred Dunnock played Mrs. Rizzo, a woman in a wheelchair pushed down a flight of stairs to her death by psychotic Udo.

Filming

Kiss of Death was shot between March and May 1947, with additional scenes being shot in June. Much of the filming was done in New York, using locations as practical sets, including the Chrysler Building, the Criminal Courts Building at 100 Centre Street, the old Hotel Marguery at 270 Park Avenue at 48th Street, the St. Nicholas Arena, and the now-demolished Bronx House of Detention for Men (later known as the Bronx County Jail) at 151st Street and River Avenue.

The exterior scenes of the family home were shot in Astoria, Queens New York at 14th Place and Astoria Park, and the Triboro Bridge and the Hell Gate Bridge can seen in the background over Astoria Park.

Non-NYC locations include:

Sing Sing Penitentiary in Ossining
Academy of the Holy Angels in Fort Lee, New Jersey was used as the orphanage where Nick visits his daughters. The site is now occupied by Mediterranean Towers South at 2000 Linwood Avenue.  The school moved to Demarest, NJ in 1965.

A deleted scene involving Nick's wife Maria (who was played by Patricia Morison) was cut from the film. In this scene, a gangster (played by Henry Brandon) who is supposed to look out for her while Nick is in prison rapes her. Afterwards, Maria commits suicide by sticking her head in the kitchen oven and turning on the gas. Both scenes were cut from the original print at the insistence of the censors, who wanted no depiction of either a rape or a suicide, so although Morison's name appears in the credits, she does not appear in the film at all. Mention is made later in the film about Mature's wife's suicide and a now obscure reference is made by Nettie that the unseen gangster Rizzo contributed to the wife's downfall.

Widmark claimed that he only worked thirteen days during filming of the film, but had to go out to California for three or four days when a new ending was shot because Nick's wife suicide scene was cut out.

According to Widmark, there were pads on the bottom of the stairs during Mildred Dunnock's scene as well as men to catch her, but the cameraman forgot to rack the film and the scene had to be shot a second time.

Hathaway later said he "loved the picture because I liked working outside. It was exciting to manoeuvre things and get work done without people on the streets knowing that you were filming." He said the only problem was Victor Mature. "He was carousing all the time and up all night and sleeping all day on the set. He was dirty. I bought him a couple of new suits, and I found him in the men's toilet, lying on the floor asleep in one of the new suits I'd bought him. But he was a good actor."

Darryl Zanuck said "we got some wonderful atmosphere" filming on location "but we paid for it."

Alternate ending

Originally, Nick was supposed to die after he allowed Tommy Udo to shoot him repeatedly, so Udo could be prosecuted for his murder. However, it was decided that it was too depressing to have Nick die, so in the narration by Nick's wife, Nettie, she says that Nick survives.

Reception

Box office
The film was not a major success but managed to break even on the world market.

Critical reception

Writers Raymond Borde and Etienne Chaumeton wrote: "From Henry Hathaway's Kiss of Death (1947), one will remember that nasty little creep with the wild eyes and high-pitched laugh, neurotic to the core, which Richard Widmark has turned into one of his finest roles."

Critic Nick Schager wrote: "It would be no surprise to learn that Richard Widmark was a big 'Batman' fan, as his star-making screen debut in Kiss of Death as grinning, cackling psychopath Tommy Udo (for which he received an Academy Award nomination) seems heavily indebted to the Caped Crusader's arch-nemesis The Joker. Certainly, the live-wire actor's amoral lunatic, a fiend who delights in pushing crippled wheelchair using women down stairs, is the primary (and perhaps only) reason to sit through Henry Hathaway's over-praised 1947 noir, a jumbled piece of cinematic crime fiction that's visually elegant (having been neorealistically shot on-location throughout Manhattan) but regularly confused about its own point of view."

Author and film critic Leonard Maltin awarded the film three out of a possible four stars, stating that the film was starting to "show its age, with cops and robbers a bit too polite", while also praising Widmark and Mature's performances.
The impact of Widmark's performance as Tommy Udo found expression in a number of unusual ways. College fraternities formed Tommy Udo clubs "with the intent of putting women in their place." For years, people handed the actor blank phonograph disks on which they wanted him to record the maniacal laugh he used in the film.

In popular culture
Widmark's performance in Kiss of Death inspired the name of mystery and crime writer Donald E. Westlake's best-known continuing pseudonym, Richard Stark, under which he wrote some of his darkest, most violent books. According to Westlake, "part of (Widmark's) fascination and danger is his unpredictability. He's fast and mean, and that's what I wanted the writing to be: crisp and lean, no fat, trimmed down ... stark."

Accolades

Adaptations
 On January 12, 1948, Widmark, Victor Mature and Coleen Gray reprised their screen roles for a Lux Radio Theatre broadcast. Mature and Widmark also reprised their screen roles for three broadcasts on The Screen Guild Theater, the first of which aired on October 28, 1948.
 In the anthology film O. Henry's Full House, Henry Hathaway directed the segment entitled "The Clarion Call" with Richard Widmark playing creepy psychopath Johnny Kernan, an eerily familiar reprise of his Tommy Udo character.
 A 1958 Western version of the film was made, this time entitled, The Fiend Who Walked the West, directed by Gordon Douglas and starring Hugh O'Brian and Robert Evans.
 Another remake, also named Kiss of Death, was made in 1995, directed by Barbet Schroeder and starring David Caruso, Nicolas Cage, Samuel L. Jackson and Helen Hunt. The remake kept the crime plot in place, but omitted Tommy Udo.

References

External links
 
 
 
 
 

1947 films
1947 crime drama films
1940s crime thriller films
20th Century Fox films
American black-and-white films
American crime thriller films
1940s English-language films
Film noir
Films based on short fiction
Films directed by Henry Hathaway
Films scored by David Buttolph
Films set in New York (state)
Films shot in New Jersey
Films shot in New York (state)
Films with screenplays by Ben Hecht
Films with screenplays by Charles Lederer
1940s prison films
1940s American films
American gangster films